Chrysopilus ater  is a species of snipe fly in the family Rhagionidae

Distribution
St. Vincent.

References

Rhagionidae
Insects described in 1896
Diptera of North America
Endemic fauna of Saint Vincent and the Grenadines
Taxa named by Samuel Wendell Williston